Chittagong Ideal High School is an educational institution in Chittagong, Bangladesh. It was established on 1998.  It is located in Jamalkhan Road in Chittagong. More than a thousand students take their Secondary School Certificates every year from the institution.

The school primarily started in a rented 4 storied building and 1 year later it rented another building beside the previous one. Finally the school built their own 10 storied building which was fully equipped with all necessary facilities. In 2012 the school started it Secondary college section.

Mr. A K Mahmudul Haq; a renowned school teacher and Nationally awarded "Principal"; is the founding Chairman of the Chittagong Ideal School and College Trust.Mrs Amena Shaheen is the Founder Principal.

The school is becoming a center of excellence and quality education in the Chittagong City and also nationwide.

Accreditation
The school was accredited by Chittagong Education Board in 2006.

References 
 https://web.archive.org/web/20130902142618/http://chittagong-website.com/col.htm
 https://www.facebook.com/pages/Chittagong-Ideal-School-College/254161221738
 http://cisc-98.doomby.com/

Educational institutions established in 1998
Colleges in Chittagong
1998 establishments in Bangladesh